Little Fish is a 2020 American science fiction romantic drama film directed by Chad Hartigan and written by Mattson Tomlin, based on the 2011 short story of the same name by Aja Gabel. It stars Olivia Cooke, Jack O'Connell, Raúl Castillo, and Soko.

It was released on February 5, 2021, by IFC Films.

Premise
A couple fights to hold their relationship together as a memory loss virus spreads and threatens to erase the history of their love and courtship.

Cast
 Olivia Cooke as Emma Ryerson
 Jack O'Connell as Jude Williams
 Raúl Castillo as Benjamin “Ben” Richards
 Soko as Samantha

Production
In March 2019, it was announced that Chad Hartigan would direct a film adaptation of Aja Gabel's short story "Little Fish", with Mattson Tomlin writing the screenplay, and Olivia Cooke, Jack O'Connell, Raúl Castillo and Soko starring. Brian Kavanaugh-Jones, Rian Cahill, Tim Headington, Lia Buman, Chris Ferguson and Tomlin were set to produce the film, while Cooke, Fred Berger, Teddy Schwarzman, Ben Stillman, Michael Heimler and Max Silva would serve as executive producers under their Black Bear Pictures, Automatik, Tango Entertainment and Oddfellows Entertainment banners, respectively.

Principal photography took place from March 11 to April 12, 2019, in British Columbia, Canada.

Release
It was scheduled to have its world premiere at the Tribeca Film Festival on April 17, 2020. However, the festival was postponed due to the COVID-19 pandemic. In September 2020, IFC Films acquired distribution rights to the film, and released it in theaters on February 5, 2021.

Reception
Review aggregator Rotten Tomatoes gives the film a 91% approval rating based on 78 reviews, with an average rating of 7.3/10. The website's critics consensus reads: "Tough but stirring, Little Fish uses one couple's pandemic love story to illustrate the strength of human connection in trying times." According to Metacritic, which sampled eleven critics and calculated a weighted average score of 71 out of 100, the film received "generally favorable reviews".

References

External links

2021 romantic drama films
2021 science fiction films
2020s English-language films
2020s science fiction drama films
American romantic drama films
American science fiction drama films
American science fiction romance films
Black Bear Pictures films
Films about altered memories
Films based on science fiction short stories
Films postponed due to the COVID-19 pandemic
Films scored by Keegan DeWitt
Films shot in British Columbia
Films with screenplays by Mattson Tomlin
IFC Films films
2020s American films